The Cacapon River (meaning Medicine Waters), located in the Appalachian Mountains of West Virginia's Eastern Panhandle region, is an  shallow river known for its fishing, boating, wildlife, hunting, and wilderness scenery. As part of the Potomac River watershed, it is an American Heritage River.

The Cacapon River Watershed is made up of three major river segments and many smaller stream watersheds. The largest tributary of the Cacapon is the North River, which drains , an area comparable to that of the Lost River. The Cacapon watershed is itself part of the Chesapeake Bay watershed.

In recent years the Cacapon River and its watershed have become threatened by development, and industrial and agricultural growth. Concern about these issues led to the establishment of the Cacapon Institute in 1985 (originally known as the Pine Cabin Run Ecological Laboratory).

Course

Emergence to Hampshire County line 

The Cacapon River emerges from underground in a gap in Sandy Ridge (1683 feet/513 m) west of Wardensville. It is actually the reemergence of the Lost River, which sinks into an underground channel east of McCauley near the entrance to Camp Pinnacle. From its emergence, the Cacapon River creates a horseshoe bend shaped gap through Sandy Ridge and flows east paralleling West Virginia Route 55/West Virginia Route 259 to its north. At Wardensville, the river is joined by Trout Run and then curves northeastward where it meanders through an expansive valley plain. Here, it is fed by Slate Rock Run and then Moores Run further north. Waites Run, a tributary draining some of the western slopes of Great North Mountain enters the Cacapon River near the bridge on Rt. 55, north of Wardensville.  Shortly after its confluence with Sine Run, the Cacapon River continues north into Hampshire County.

Hampshire County line to Yellow Spring 
From the county line, the river is bounded to its east by the George Washington National Forest and to its west by Baker Mountain (2024 feet/617 m). Throughout this stretch, the Cacapon River is also joined by sections of the old Winchester and Western Railroad grade. It continues its meandering course northeastward, flowing past the community of Intermont and Hebron Church. At Capon Lake, the river is joined by Capon Springs Run and is the site of the historic Capon Lake Whipple Truss Bridge. West Virginia Route 259 parallels the Cacapon River to its west along the eastern flank of Baker Mountain until the road turns east across the Kenneth Seldon Bridge at Yellow Spring. From Yellow Spring Gap, the river is fed by a run whose source is the "Yellow Spring".

Yellow Spring to Kale Hollow 

The Cacapon River moves north along the eastern flank of Cacapon Mountain (1913 feet/583 m) with Cacapon River Road (West Virginia Secondary Route 14) paralleling it to its west. From Yellow Spring, the river flows by  Camps Rim Rock and White Mountain. After another immense horseshoe bend, the Cacapon River moves past the communities of Hooks Mills and Bubbling Spring and is joined by Old Man Run and Kale Hollow's run. The river's stretch through Bubbling Spring is a popular location for summer river camps which consist of cottages, trailers, and campers on narrow river lots. This stretch of the Cacapon River is also the scene for numerous old plantation houses including the Captain David Pugh House (Riversdell) at Hooks Mills, listed on the National Register of Historic Places.

Kale Hollow to Cold Stream 
North of Kale Hollow, the Cacapon River is joined to its west by Dillons Mountain (1913 feet/583 m). To its east, the river is paralleled by Christian Church Road (West Virginia Secondary Route 13), on which is located the 18th century Capon Chapel. After its confluence with Mill Branch, the Cacapon River bends through the small historic town of Capon Bridge. It is met by Dillons Run from its west and traversed by a bridge of the Northwestern Turnpike (U.S. Route 50), from which Capon Bridge takes its name. From Capon Bridge, the Cacapon River is bounded to its east by Bear Garden Mountain (1572 feet/479 m). It is then joined by Edwards Run and Cold Stream near the community of Cold Stream.

Cold Stream to Largent 

The river meanders north around Darbys Nose (1287 feet/392 m), flanked to its east by Leith Mountain (1598 feet/487 m). The stretch of the Cacapon River between Cold Stream and Forks of Cacapon is mountainous and forested with little development. It meanders through a series of mountain ridges, on one of which, Castle Mountain (1260 feet/384 m), sits the Caudy's Castle rock outcrop. Bloomery Pike (West Virginia Route 127) passes over the river where it is met by Bloomery Run east of Forks of Cacapon. North of Bloomery Pike lies the actual "Forks of Cacapon" where the Cacapon and North Rivers converge. From Forks of Cacapon to Largent, the river creates a number of horseshoe bends between Sideling Hill (2021 feet/616 m) and Little Mountain (1429 feet/435 m). This stretch of the Cacapon River is also mostly undeveloped and forested with the exception of a gated community, The Crossings, located between the WV 127 bridge and Largent.

Largent to Great Cacapon 

The Cacapon River meanders into Morgan County at Largent where Cacapon Road (West Virginia Route 9) passes over it and the river is met by Stony Creek. It continues its meandering course northeast between Sideling Hill and Little Mountain until Fisher's Bridge where it is joined to its east by the western flanks of Cacapon Mountain. Tonoloway Ridge (992 feet/302 m) then bounds the Cacapon River to its west until it reaches the railroad hamlet of Great Cacapon. After passing under the WV 9 and old Baltimore and Ohio Railroad bridges, the Cacapon River joins the Potomac.

Name and variants 
Cacapon is a name derived from the Shawnee language meaning "medicine water".

The Board on Geographic Names decided on "Cacapon River" in 1916 as the river's official name and spelling. Variants include:

Big Capon River 	
Cacapehon Creek 	
Cacapehon River 	
Cacapon Creek
Cacapon River
Cackapehon River 	
Cackapohon River 	
Capcappin Creek 	
Cape Capon River
Capecapon River 	
Capon River 	
Great Cacapehon River 	
Great Cacapon River 	
Great Capon River

Bridges

Float trips 
All locations listed below are designated public access sites by the West Virginia Division of Natural Resources at their website. Access sites are listed from south to north.

Tributaries 

Tributary streams are listed from south to north. Major tributaries are listed in bold.

Lost River
Trout Run
Waites Run
Slate Rock Run
Moores Run
Sine Run
Harness Run
Hawk Run
Capon Springs Run
Himmelwright Run
Dry Run
Yellow Spring Run
Falling Run
Loman Branch
Crooked Run
Old Man Run
Kale Hollow Run
Mill Branch
Dillons Run
Gunbarrel Hollow Run
Parks Hollow Run

Edwards Run and Edwards Run Lake
Cold Stream
Frog Hollow Run
Bloomery Run
Ivy Run
North River
Grassy Lick Run
Tearcoat Creek
Bearwallow Creek
Bowers Run
Wolf Hollow Run
Critton Run
Falling Spring Run
Stony Creek
Constant Run
Whisners Run
Connor Hollow Run

Cities and towns along the Cacapon River 

Bubbling Spring
Capon Bridge
Capon Lake
Cold Stream
Davis Ford
Forks of Cacapon
Great Cacapon
Hooks Mills
Intermont
Largent
Wardensville
Yellow Spring

See also
List of West Virginia rivers

References

External links

The Cacapon Institute
Friends of the Cacapon River
Cacapon and Lost Rivers Land Trust
West Virginia Division of Natural Resources

American Heritage Rivers
Rivers of Hampshire County, West Virginia
Rivers of Hardy County, West Virginia
Rivers of Morgan County, West Virginia
Rivers of West Virginia
Tributaries of the Potomac River